The short-tailed pipit (Anthus brachyurus) is a species of bird in the family Motacillidae.
It is found in Angola, Burundi, Republic of the Congo, Democratic Republic of the Congo, Gabon, Mozambique, Rwanda, Somalia, South Africa, Tanzania, Uganda, Zambia, and Zimbabwe.
Its natural habitats are subtropical or tropical dry lowland grassland and subtropical or tropical seasonally wet or flooded lowland grassland.

References

 Short-tailed pipit - Species text in The Atlas of Southern African Birds.

short-tailed pipit
Birds of Central Africa
Birds of Sub-Saharan Africa
short-tailed pipit
Taxonomy articles created by Polbot